Lifeless may refer to:

 Dead, having lost life
 Lifeless (EP), the first release by Eighteen Visions
 Lifeless (Mark Billingham novel), BCA 2006 crime thriller of the year nominee
 Lifeless Planet, a 2014 video game

See also
 Deathless (disambiguation)